Broadway High School may refer to:

Broadway High School (San Jose, California)
Broadway High School (Broadway, Virginia)
Broadway High School (Seattle)